Lan Lan (1969 - September 4, 1979) was a female giant panda born in China. Along with Kang Kang, they were the first pair of giant pandas at the Ueno Zoo, gifted to Japan by China after the normalization of relations between the two countries.

Lan Lan and Kang Kang caused an immediate sensation when they arrived in Japan.  Subsequently, a so-called "panda boom" occurred in the country. In 1974, this pair of giant pandas attracted 7.64 million visitors.

Kang Kang and Lan Lan failed to give birth to babies. In September 1979, 10-year-old Lan Lan died of acute renal insufficiency complicated by uremia, and the fetus was found in its belly during the autopsy.

See also
 Kang Kang
 Panda diplomacy

References

1969 animal births
1979 animal deaths
Individual giant pandas
Individual animals in Japan